Song Xiaobo (born September 8, 1958) is a Chinese basketball player and coach. She is perhaps the most celebrated woman basketball player of the 1970s era in China; as a player she had outstanding all around ball skills, a very high level of athleticism, and a clear, bright, driving work ethic.  Song was outstanding at every position from guard to center and she enjoys acclaim as "China's greatest female basketball player of all time". She is currently the CEO of a sports promotion company in Beijing.

Basketball career
Song Xiaobo was born to a basketball family in Beijing; both her mother and father played basketball.  In 1975 she competed for Beijing in the 3rd Chinese National Games, and in 1979 in the 4th Chinese National Games; and in 1977, 1979 and 1981 in the Chinese National Women's Basketball Tournament.

Sung's first participation as a member of the China women's national basketball team came in 1983 at the FIBA World Championship for Women; China won the bronze medal and Song received two individual awards, forthwith becoming the pre-eminent woman basketballer in China, and presently the captain of the national team.  At the 1984 Summer Olympics Sung represented the Chinese athletic delegation and carried the national flag at the opening ceremonies; soon thereafter she and the team stood on the medal platform having won the bronze medal.  During this era she also led the national team to their 4th and 5th Asian championships out of 9 possible total chances.

In 1985, after retiring from play, Sung began a career as a basketball coach in China, and toured to Australia, Taiwan and other places as a teacher and coach.  At the present she is chairman of a Beijing-based sports promotion company, working in creating financing and investment for sports organizations, especially for basketball leagues and facilities.

Honors and awards
 1979, 1982 1983, listed on the China Top Ten List of Athletes
 1983 World Women's Basketball Championship Top scorer and MVP
1983 World Women's Basketball Championship team bronze medal
 1984 Olympics team bronze medal
 4 Asian championships
 Chosen to "China's Top 50 Basketball Players of All Time" list

References
This article was translated from :zh:宋晓波

External links
  Song Xiaobo at sina.com
  Song Xiaobo at sohu.com

1958 births
Living people
Chinese women's basketball players
Chinese women's basketball coaches
Basketball players from Beijing
Basketball players at the 1984 Summer Olympics
Medalists at the 1984 Summer Olympics
Olympic basketball players of China
Olympic bronze medalists for China
Olympic medalists in basketball
Basketball players at the 1978 Asian Games
Basketball players at the 1982 Asian Games
Asian Games medalists in basketball
Asian Games gold medalists for China
Asian Games silver medalists for China
Medalists at the 1978 Asian Games
Medalists at the 1982 Asian Games
Centers (basketball)
Guards (basketball)